Bonnerichthys is a genus of fossil fishes within the family Pachycormidae that lived during the Coniacian to Maastrichtian stage of the Late Cretaceous. Fossil remains of this taxon were first described from the Smoky Hill Member of the Niobrara Chalk Formation of Kansas (Late Coniacian-Early Campanian), and additional material was later reported from the Pierre Shale, Mooreville Chalk, Demopolis Chalk, Wenonah Formation, and Moreno Formation, among other localities.

Feeding
One of the most significant features of Bonnerichthys is the recognition that it was a filter feeder, living on plankton. This recognition that many large-bodied fish from the Mesozoic in the Pachycormidae were filter feeders shows that this niche was filled for at least 100 million years before previously known. The modern niche is filled by several species of sharks and the baleen whales.

The international team that described the genus named it after the Marion Charles Bonner fossil hunting family, whose collections from the Niobrara Cretaceous chalk of western Kansas are in many museums and research institutions.

References

External links 
Bonnerichthys at the Oceans of Kansas website. Includes detailed taxonomic history, life restorations, bibliography, many photos of fossil remains.
Bonnerichthys discussion at boneblogger.com

Cretaceous bony fish
Prehistoric ray-finned fish genera
Fossil taxa described in 2010
Pachycormiformes
Late Cretaceous fish of North America